Cărturești Carusel /kərtureʃti karusel/ is a bookstore on Lipscani 55 Street in the old town of Bucharest, Romania. It belongs to the Romanian bookstore chain Cărturești.

The building that currently houses the bookstore was built at the beginning of the 20th century by the Chrissoveloni bankers family. During the first few decades of its existence the building housed the Chrissoveloni Bank headquarters, and afterwards it became a general store. At the end of the 1990s and early 2000s the building fell into decay, up until 2015 when a five year long rehabilitation, strengthening and conversion project was complete.

Gallery

References

External links 

Bookstores of Romania
Companies based in Bucharest
Lipscani